The 1987 Foster's World Doubles was the sixth staging of the doubles snooker tournament. It was played at the Derngate in Northampton and held between 1 and 13 December 1987 with the tournament televised on ITV from 4 December. Foster's became the sponsors for this tournament as part of the Courage Group as was previous sponsor Hofmeister.

Steve Davis and Tony Meo lost out in the pre-TV stages to unknowns Martin Clark and Jim Chambers 5–1 and the only time they failed to make the last 16 in the history of the World Doubles. The previous year's finalists Mike Hallett and Stephen Hendry went on to win the final World Doubles beating Cliff Thorburn and Dennis Taylor 12–6 and as most of the champions of the tournament, they got the highest combined break of 182. The championship was discontinued as other snooker events were now filling the calendar.

Selected early results

First two rounds were played at the Crest Hotel, Portsmouth between 26 and 28 October 1987.

1st Round

2nd Round

3rd Round

Last 16 onwards

References

World Doubles Championship
1987 in snooker
World Doubles Championship